Lowerhouses is a residential district in the town of Huddersfield, Kirklees, West Yorkshire, England.

It comprises multiple social housing estates, with a mixture of private housing throughout.

It has a primary school, two local shops and a take-away.

See also
Listed buildings in Huddersfield (Newsome Ward - outer areas)

Areas of Huddersfield